Gregor Sračnjek (born 6 May 1979) is a Slovenian rower. He competed at the 2000 Summer Olympics and the 2004 Summer Olympics.

References

1979 births
Living people
Slovenian male rowers
Olympic rowers of Slovenia
Rowers at the 2000 Summer Olympics
Rowers at the 2004 Summer Olympics
Sportspeople from Kranj